Itabari Njeri is an American journalist, novelist, and memoirist.

Life
Njeri was raised in Brooklyn and Harlem. She graduated from Boston University, and Columbia University with an M.S.
In 1978, she joined The Miami Herald, and then The Los Angeles Times.
In 1995, she was writer in residence at Washington University in St. Louis.  She studied at Harvard University.

Her work appeared in Harper's.

Awards
 1990 American Book Award

Works

 
 The Secret Life of Fred Astaire

Anthologies

References

21st-century American novelists
American women novelists
21st-century American memoirists
Writers from Brooklyn
People from Harlem
Boston University alumni
Columbia University alumni
Washington University in St. Louis faculty
Harvard University alumni
Living people
American women memoirists
American women journalists
21st-century American women writers
American Book Award winners
Novelists from Missouri
Novelists from New York (state)
Year of birth missing (living people)